Marco Reus (born 31 May 1989) is a German professional footballer who plays as an attacking midfielder or forward. He captains Bundesliga club Borussia Dortmund and plays for the Germany national team.

Reus spent his youth career at Borussia Dortmund, prior to leaving for Rot Weiss Ahlen. He joined Borussia Mönchengladbach in 2009, and had his most successful season in 2012, scoring 18 goals and providing 12 assists in the Bundesliga to help Borussia Mönchengladbach secure a place in the following season's UEFA Champions League. Reus returned to his hometown club Borussia Dortmund at the end of that season, helping the club reach the 2013 UEFA Champions League Final in his first season. With Dortmund, Reus won three DFL-Supercups (in 2013, 2014 and 2019), and the DFB-Pokal in 2017 and 2021, he has scored over 150 goals for the club, and is one of only three players to have reached 100 Bundesliga goals and assists each. He has been voted German Footballer of the Year twice, as well as Bundesliga Player of the Season on three occasions. 

Reus has 48 caps with the German national team. He missed the 2014 FIFA World Cup, which Germany won, UEFA Euro 2016, UEFA Euro 2020 and the 2022 FIFA World Cup, but played in UEFA Euro 2012 and the 2018 FIFA World Cup.

Club career

Early years
Reus was born in Dortmund, North Rhine-Westphalia. He began to play football for his hometown club Post SV Dortmund in 1994 and joined the youth ranks of Borussia Dortmund in 1996. He played for Borussia Dortmund until he left for the U-19 team of Rot Weiss Ahlen in the summer of 2006. During his first year there, he played as an attacking midfielder and was featured in six games for the club's second team, which played in the Westphalia league at the time. He scored a goal in each of his first two games. The following year, he was able to break into Ahlen's first team, which played in the German third division at the time. He featured in 16 games that season, two of which he started. His only goal came on the last matchday, where he played the full 90 minutes for the first time that season, and propelled the team to promotion into the 2. Bundesliga. In 2008–09, as a 19-year-old, he had his definitive breakthrough as a professional football player, playing 27 games and scoring four goals.

Borussia Mönchengladbach 

On 25 May 2009, Reus signed a four-year contract with Bundesliga club Borussia Mönchengladbach. On 28 August, he scored his first Bundesliga goal in a game against Mainz 05 after a 50-metre solo run, and since then became a prolific goalscorer for his club under Lucien Favre.

On 20 August 2010, Reus scored his first Bundesliga brace in an eventual loss against Mainz 05.

At the start of the 2011–12 season, Reus began the season in fine form, scoring 10 goals in his first 13 matches, including his first ever Bundesliga hat-trick in a 5-0 trashing against Werder Bremen on 19 November. His contract with Gladbach was set to expire in 2015 and reportedly had a buy-out clause of €18 million. Reus mentioned that his role model was Tomáš Rosický.

Borussia Dortmund

2012–13 season
On 4 January 2012, Reus signed with his former club Borussia Dortmund for a €17.1 million transfer fee on a five-year deal. He spoke about his transfer saying, "I've made the decision to take the next step forward in the coming season. I'd like to play for a club who can challenge for the league title and guarantee me Champions League football. I see this chance in Dortmund." Reus officially re-joined Dortmund on 1 July.
In Reus's league debut with Dortmund on 24 August, he scored a goal as his new side completed a 2–1 win over Werder Bremen. On 29 September, Reus scored two goals for Dortmund in a 5–0 rout of his former club Mönchengladbach, pushing the champions to the top of the Bundesliga table through six games.

On 3 October, in Reus's second ever Champions League appearance, he opened the scoring as Dortmund earned a 1–1 draw away to Manchester City. He then opened the scoring for the German champions in their 2–2 draw with Real Madrid at the Santiago Bernabéu Stadium on 6 November, netting on a spectacular volley after a kick-down from teammate Robert Lewandowski. In Dortmund's following Champions League match, on 21 November, Reus scored Dortmund's first goal in a 4–1 defeat of Ajax at the Amsterdam Arena, securing qualification for the Round of 16 as Group D winners.

On 16 February 2013, Reus scored a hat-trick, netting all the goals in Dortmund's thumping of Hessian side Eintracht Frankfurt.  On 9 April 2013, Reus scored an injury time goal which was a vital one in the stunning injury time comeback against Malaga in the quarter final leg 2 of UEFA Champions League. Dortmund won the match by 3-2 and progressed on to the next round where they defeated Real Madrid 4–3 on aggregate to reach the final. On 11 May, Reus scored a late brace against VfL Wolfsburg to help Dortmund draw the match after being two goals down.

2013–14 season

On 27 July 2013, in the 2013 DFL-Supercup against Bayern Munich, Reus netted the game's opening goal and later rounded off the scoring, as Borussia Dortmund claimed a 4–2 victory to lift the trophy. On 18 August, Reus converted a penalty kick which rounded off the scoring as Dortmund defeated Eintracht Braunschweig 2–1 at the Signal Iduna Park in the second game of Dortmund's 2013–14 league campaign. He then scored a brace against SC Freiburg, one from the penalty spot, and started the season hitting impressive form. Reus had confirmed he would be Dortmund's penalty taker for the season, though despite winning a penalty against 1860 Munich in the DFB Pokal, he allowed teammate Pierre-Emerick Aubameyang in taking the penalty which propelled the Borussia-based club into the next round of the competition. On 1 November, Reus scored a goal for Dortmund in a 6–1 league win against VfB Stuttgart.

On 25 February 2014, Reus scored a goal in a 4–2 win for Dortmund against Zenit Saint Petersburg in the first leg of the round of 16 in the UEFA Champions League. On 29 March, he then scored a hat-trick in a 3–2 win for Dortmund against Stuttgart in the Bundesliga. On 8 April, Reus scored twice in Dortmund's second leg 2–0 win against Real Madrid, though Dortmund were eventually knocked out of the competition after losing 3–2 on aggregate. Reus finished the season with 23 goals and 18 assists in all competitions.

2014–15 season
In the second match of the 2014–15 Bundesliga against FC Augsburg, Reus scored one goal and helped set up another. Dortmund went to win the match by 3–2. In September 2014, he was diagnosed with an ankle injury. On 22 October, having returned from injury, Reus contributed a goal and assist in their 4–0 Champions League group stage away win against Galatasaray. On 1 November, he scored the only goal for Dortmund in their 2–1 away loss against their rivals Bayern Munich.

Despite prior injury concerns, Reus started Dortmund's match away to SC Paderborn on 22 November and scored to put them 2–0 up. He was stretchered off in the second half, however, after which Paderborn equalised for a final score of 2–2. The injury ruled him out until January 2015. On 10 February, Reus signed a contract extension with Dortmund, keeping him at the club until 2019.

2015–16 season
On 5 August 2015, Reus scored a goal in Borussia Dortmund's 5–0 win against Wolfsberger AC to advance into the 2015–16 Europa League play-off round. On 15 August, he then opened the 2015–16 league campaign with a goal and an assist in a 4–0 home win against his former club Borussia Mönchengladbach. On 28 August, he scored a hat-trick in their 7–2 home win against Odds BK to qualify for the 2015–16 UEFA Europa League.

On 20 April 2016, Reus was one of three goalscorers as Borussia won 3–0 away at Hertha BSC in the semi-final of the DFB-Pokal. He finished the 2015–16 season with total of 23 goals and 8 assists in 43 appearances.

2016–17 season
After being sidelined due to injury, Reus made his return on 22 November 2016. He scored twice and assisted once in a historic 8–4 Champions league group stage win against Legia Warsaw. Reus took the game ball for it was originally a hat-trick game by him. On 3 December, he assisted three goals in their 4–1 win against his former club Borussia Mönchengladbach. Four days later, Reus scored in a 2–2 draw against Real Madrid; Dortmund subsequently advanced to the round 16 as the winners of Group F, ahead of Madrid. On 10 December, Reus continued his goalscoring form with a late equaliser in Dortmund's 1–1 draw with 1. FC Köln.

During the 2017 DFB-Pokal Final, Reus suffered a partial cruciate ligament tear and was substituted at halftime. Dortmund went on to win the match, giving Reus his first major trophy. The initial prognosis suggested that he would miss "several" months.

2017–18 season

On 10 February 2018, Reus recovered from the ligament damage and made his return against Hamburg in the Bundesliga. Reus scored his first goal since his return from injury and the only goal in the match against his former club Borussia Mönchengladbach in a 1–0 victory. Reus scored Dortmund's only goal in two consecutive matches against Augsburg and RB Leipzig in which both the matches ended in a 1–1 draw. On 9 March, Reus extended his contract with the club until 30 June 2023. On 21 April, Reus scored twice in a 4–0 win over Bayer Leverkusen, where he also missed a penalty. On 29 April, Reus scored a 19th-minute goal in Dortmund's 1–1 draw with Werder Bremen. On 12 May, Reus scored the only goal for the team in Dortmund's 3–1 loss to Hoffenheim. Reus finished the season with 7 goals in 15 appearances in all competitions.

2018–19 season
Prior to the start of the 2018–19 season, Reus was made club captain by incoming coach Lucien Favre. On 21 August 2018, Reus scored the winning goal in extra time to help his side earn a 2–1 victory over SpVgg Greuther Fürth in the DFB-Pokal first round match. Reus scored a 90th-minute goal which was his 100th Bundesliga goal as Dortmund defeated RB Leipzig with a 4–1 victory. On 27 September, he scored two goals including his 100th goal for Borussia Dortmund across all competitions in a 7–0 victory over 1. FC Nürnberg.

On 10 November 2018, he scored back to back goals in the second half of Der Klassiker against Bayern Munich as Dortmund came from behind to win the match 3–2. The game kept Dortmund on top of the Bundesliga table, 7 points ahead of Bayern Munich. Reus ended the season with 21 goals and 14 assists in all competitions, and was voted the 2019 Germany Footballer of the year.

2019–20 season
By February 2020, Reus had 26 appearances in all competitions, in which he scored 12 goals. However, a muscle injury kept him out for the rest of the season.

2020–21 season
On 6 April 2021, Reus scored in a 1–2 loss to Manchester City in the 2020–21 UEFA Champions League quarter-finals, to become Dortmund's all-time Champions League top scorer with 18 goals.

2021–22 season 
On 13 February 2022, Reus scored his 150th goal for Borussia Dortmund in all competitions in a 3–0 win at Union Berlin.

2022–23 season 
On 3 March 2023, Reus scored in a 2–1 victory over RB Leipzig, to become the joint second all-time goalscorer for Borussia Dortmund along with Michael Zorc with 159 goals. On 18 March, he scored a brace in a 6–1 win over 1. FC Köln, to reach his 150th Bundesliga goal, and to become the lone second top scorer for his club with 161 goals, only behind Alfred Preissler with 177 goals.

International career

On 11 August 2009, Reus made his Germany under-21 debut in a friendly match against Turkey. On 6 May 2010, he earned his first call-up to the senior team for a friendly match against Malta on 14 May. On 11 May, he withdrew from the squad due to a leg injury picked up in the last game of the season against Bayer Leverkusen. On 7 October 2011, he made his debut against Turkey. He scored his first goal for the team on 26 May 2012 in a 5–3 defeat to Switzerland. On 22 June, he scored in the UEFA Euro 2012 quarter-final against Greece, his first start for Germany in the tournament.

Reus established himself as a regular member of Joachim Löw's side in the 2014 FIFA World Cup qualification campaign, scoring five goals and registering three assists in six matches. He was named in Germany's squad for the World Cup finals, but was ultimately forced to withdraw after suffering an ankle injury in the team's 6–1 warm-up win against Armenia on 6 June. Reus made his international comeback in Germany's first post-World Cup friendly against Argentina on 3 September 2014. However, the world champions were defeated 4–2 by the side they had beaten in the World Cup final two months earlier.

During qualification for UEFA Euro 2016, Reus made four appearances, scoring once in a 2–0 defeat of Georgia in Tbilisi but was not selected for the tournament after suffering a groin injury.

On 2 June 2018, Reus made his return to international duty after two years in a friendly match against Austria, which ended in a 2–1 loss for Germany. Reus was included in Joachim Löw's 23-man final squad for the 2018 FIFA World Cup on 4 June. On 17 June, Reus made his first World Cup appearance during their opening match against Mexico as a substitute by replacing Sami Khedira in the 60th minute, but the match ended in a 1–0 loss for Germany. On 23 June, Reus scored an equalizing goal and his first World Cup goal in the second half as Germany defeated Sweden with 2–1 victory in their second group stage match to resurrect their World Cup hopes. He also provided an assist to Toni Kroos's late winning goal in that match and was named Man of the Match. However, his side were knocked out from the tournament after losing 2–0 to South Korea in their last group stage match on 27 June.

In May 2021, Reus announced his decision to not participate in the postponed UEFA Euro 2020 due to post-season fatigue.

In November 2022, Reus was exempt from Hansi Flick's 2022 FIFA World Cup squad reportedly as a result of an ankle injury, which he had failed to recover from in time.

Style of play 
Reus is renowned for his versatility, speed, agility, technical skills, intelligence, and shooting ability; however he is also known for his proneness to injury. In 2012, Franz Beckenbauer spoke about Reus, along with Mario Götze, saying, "...as a classic duo there is nobody better than the prolific Reus and Götze." Reus was voted the Footballer of the Year (Germany) in 2012 and was named in the UEFA Team of the Year in 2013. In 2013, he was ranked as the fourth best footballer in Europe by Bloomberg. Although he is highly regarded for his attacking movement, powerful finishing with either foot in open play, timing, and eye for goal, as well as his accuracy from set pieces, Reus is also a hard-working player and a precise passer, who possesses good vision, which enables him to create chances and provide assists to teammates, in addition to scoring goals himself. As such, Reus is a versatile forward, who is capable of playing in several offensive positions, and has been deployed as a second striker, in a central role as an out-and-out striker (although this is not his favoured position), as a winger on either flank (although he favours the left side, as it allows him to cut inside onto his stronger right foot), and also in a central attacking midfield role as a number 10.

Personal life
Reus is named after the Netherlands legend, Marco van Basten. According to Reus, his parents were originally going to name him 'Dennis' but thanks to Van Basten's famous volley goal against Soviet Union in the final of Euro 1988 they decided to name him Marco.

Reus dated Carolin Bohs in 2009. They broke up in 2013 but remain close friends. Reus started dating German model Scarlett Gartmann in December 2015. Together they had their first child in March 2019 and got married later the same year.

Reus has said that, if he was not a professional football player, he would be a pilot.

Reus was the cover athlete of FIFA 17, after being voted in by a fans' poll organized by Electronic Arts.

In March 2020, Reus and his wife, Scarlett, donated €500,000 to people and smaller businesses in need in his hometown of Dortmund during the COVID-19 pandemic.

Legal issues
In December 2014, Reus was fined €540,000 for driving without a valid licence, which constitutes a felony in Germany. The fine was based on his then monthly salary of €180,000. He had been driving for years with a fake Dutch licence, a felony in its own right, and has been issued with speeding tickets on at least five occasions since 2011 without authorities knowing that he was not legally licensed. The felony charges for using a counterfeit licence were later dropped, causing some controversy and raising questions from politicians whether his celebrity status had been a reason for a milder sentence. When convicted, Reus said, "The reasons I did it are something I cannot really understand." Prior to his conviction, he had appeared in commercials for cars and petrol. In August 2016, Reus confirmed that he now has a driver's licence.

Career statistics

Club

International

Germany score listed first, score column indicates score after each Reus goal

Honours
Rot Weiss Ahlen
 Regionalliga Nord: 2007–08

Borussia Dortmund
 DFB-Pokal: 2016–17, 2020–21
 DFL-Supercup: 2013, 2014, 2019
 UEFA Champions League runner-up: 2012–13

Individual
Bundesliga Team of the Season: 2011–12, 2012–13, 2013–14, 2014–15, 2015–16, 2018–19
kicker Bundesliga Team of the Season: 2011–12, 2013–14, 2018–19
Bundesliga Player of the Season: 2011–12, 2013–14, 2018–19
Bundesliga Breakthrough of the Season: 2011–12
Footballer of the Year in Germany: 2012, 2019
German national Player of the Year: 2018
Borussia Dortmund Player of the Year: 2013–14
Bundesliga top assist provider: 2013–14 
UEFA Team of the Year: 2013
UEFA Champions League Team of the Season: 2013–14
Goal of the Month (Germany): January 2012, June 2012, September 2012
 ESM Team of the Season: 2018–19
Bundesliga Player of the Month: September 2018, November 2018, December 2018

References

External links

Profile at the Borussia Dortmund website
German national team profile 

Kicker profile 
Bundesliga profile

1989 births
Living people
Footballers from Dortmund
German footballers
Association football midfielders
Association football forwards
Rot Weiss Ahlen players
Borussia Mönchengladbach players
Borussia Dortmund players
Oberliga (football) players
Regionalliga players
2. Bundesliga players
Bundesliga players
Germany under-21 international footballers
Germany international footballers
UEFA Euro 2012 players
2018 FIFA World Cup players